Paul Hervey-Brookes is an multi-award-winning garden designer and plantsman who lives between the Cotswolds, England And the Loire Valley in France.

Career 

Paul Hervey-Brookes is a noted English garden designer and plantsman. Paul grew up in Oxford and studied at both Pershore College of Horticulture and The Royal Botanic Garden Edinburgh.

Paul has won numerous medals at Royal Horticultural Society Shows, including Gold and Best in Show at Tatton Park in 2015, Gold at Chelsea Flower Show in 2013 and at Hampton Court Palace Flower Show in 2012. He has won 4 Best in Shows Awards and People's Choice.

Paul has represented the United Kingdom at the Gardening World Cup in Japan in 2013, where he won Gold and Best Planting Award and again for an unprecedented second time in 2014 winning Gold, Best in Show and Best Planting . Paul has exhibited at other international garden shows such as The Ellerslie International Flower Show held in New Zealand, Scene's du Jardin held in Lyon, Japan Home & Garden Show 2015 and the Philadelphia International Flower Show.

In 2014 The Royal Horticultural Society announced that Paul would be Mentor for the Royal Horticultural Society prestigious Young Designer of the Year competition which culminates in the finalists creating gardens at RHS Tatton Park Flower Show after having ten intensive months of guidance from Paul and the RHS Team.  Paul has been a Trials Member for the RHS Award of Garden Merit an industry wide recognised scheme which trials and evaluates the garden worthiness of plant material, since 2016 Paul has been an RHS Gardens Judge and chairman at shows such as RHS Chelsea, RHS Malvern Spring Garden Festival and RHS Tatton Park.

As a design practice Paul Hervey-Brookes Associates works both in the United Kingdom and Internationally on private and public commissions.

In 2017 Paul was made an Honorary Fellow of the Institute of Quarrying, this award recognised his work promoting the industry to a wider audience and informing people about the active biodiversity creation which quarry can generate.  The Fellowship is normally awarded to Past Presidents of the Institute and is as such their highest award.  To date Paul is the only person outside of the Quarrying and Aggregates industry that has been awarded this honour.

Bradstone Design

Launched in 2013 Bradstone Design be a series of highly inspirational garden designs created as downloadable packs for the paving and garden stone manufacturer Bradstone. The designs are all based on a domestic scale gardens and have a range of options from downloading the design guide and creating on a 'DIY' basis to being fully installed by a Bradstone Assured Landscape Contractor.

Marks & Spencer

In Autumn 2012 Marks & Spencer launched an exclusive range of gardening gifts designed by Paul.   The Range is aimed at increasing habitat and biodiversity in the garden whilst remaining elegant and desirable.  To date Paul is the only garden designer Marks & Spencer have approached to work with.

Allomorphic

Allomorphic was a garden and lifestyle Concept store whose motto is 'Inspired by the Garden'  There were two stores in Stroud, the first opening in March 2016 and the second September 2017. Alongside plants for the house and garden Allomorphic source a wealth of garden and lifestyle products, crafts and ceramics from individual makers and a range of own brand goods from tea, soaps and body creams to project paints, greetings cards, bird food and bags.  The idea to create an aspirational yet affordable gardening brand was originally conceived by Pauls partner Yann Eshkol (1981 – 2016) and they opened the first store jointly as a showcase of their combined designed ideas. Allomorphic closed in spring 2020

Media 

Paul is a monthly columnist for Cotswold Life Magazine and writes for Real Homes Magazine. Paul's gardens have received much coverage both in national newspapers, including the Times, Telegraph and Financial Times and internationally in titles such as the German publications, Im garden and Garten Design Exclusiv alongside the French Gardening Journal L'art des Jardins.  Pau also provides content for on-line magazines and content providers such as Amara, Luxpad and Aggregate Industries and for more traditional print media.  He has been featured in on-line content providers including World Landscape Architecture Review

On television Paul has contributed pieces for BBC1 Country Tracks programme, the BBC Chelsea Flower Show coverage and his work has appeared on BBC Television series Bees, Butterflies & Blooms. Hosted by Sarah Raven the programme concentrated on a series of high-profile locations throughout Harrogate which had been designed by Paul to attract wildlife and create habitat.\

References

External links 

 Paul Hervey-Brookes Associates. Landscape & Garden Design: 
 BrandAlley Garden Chelsea Flower Show 2013: 
 My Gardening School Interview Paul Hervey-Brookes: 
 Royal National Institute for the Blind Garden, Chelsea Flower Show 2011: 
 Discover Jordan garden, Hampton Court Palace 2012: 
 Allomorphic 

English gardeners
Year of birth missing (living people)
Living people
Landscape or garden designers